San Martino is a village in Tuscany, central Italy, administratively a frazione of the comune of Monteriggioni, province of Siena. At the time of the 2001 census its population was 399.

San Martino is about 10 km from Siena and 9 km from Monteriggioni.

References 

Frazioni of Monteriggioni